Baranovo is a rural locality (a settlement) in Borisovskoye Rural Settlement, Chagodoshchensky District, Vologda Oblast, Russia. The population was 27 as of 2002.

Geography 
Kolobovo is the nearest rural locality.

References 

Rural localities in Chagodoshchensky District